The 2007 Texas Christian Horned Frog football team represented Texas Christian University in the 2007 NCAA Division I FBS football season. The team was coached by Gary Patterson, who took over the program in December 2000. The Frogs played their home games in Amon G. Carter Stadium, which is located on campus in Fort Worth.

The Horned Frogs returned nine starters from their 2006 defense, which ended the season ranked 2nd nationally.  Headlining the defense was All-America candidate defensive end Tommy Blake.  On offense, the Frogs returned six starters and was led by redshirt freshman quarterback Andy Dalton.

On July 23, the Mountain West Conference held their annual Media Blitz in Las Vegas, where members of the media picked the Frogs as the favorite to win the conference.  The media selected Aaron Brown as Preseason Offensive Player of the Year and Tommy Blake as Preseason Defensive Player of the Year.

Schedule

Statistical leaders

Sacks:

Returning honorees
Tommy Blake, Sr. defensive end: First Team All-MWC 2005 & 2006
Chase Ortiz, Sr. defensive end: First Team All-MWC 2005 & 2006
Jason Phillips, Jr. linebacker: First Team All-MWC 2006, Second Team All-MWC 2005
Brian Bonner, Sr. safety/punt returner: First Team All-MWC PR, Second Team All-MWC Safety, 2006
Aaron Brown, Jr. running back: Second Team All-MWC 2006, MWC Freshman of the Year 2005
Matty Lindner, Sr. guard: Second Team All-MWC 2006

Game summaries

Baylor

With the 27–0 win, the Horned Frogs evened the all-time series with the Bears at 49–49–7. Defensive end Tommy Blake did not dress for the game, and running back Aaron Brown left in the first half with a knee injury. Redshirt freshman quarterback Andy Dalton, making his first career start, threw for 205 yards and a touchdown. Two missed field goals by Baylor and four interceptions by the TCU defense helped preserve the shutout. It was TCU's fifth consecutive victory over a Big 12 team.

Texas

This was the second of three contests TCU had in 2007 against former SWC rivals, and this was the first time these two schools had faced each other since the conference disbanded following the 1995 season. With the win, Texas now leads the all-time series, 61–20–1.  TCU led the game 10–0 at halftime on two interceptions- one returned for a touchdown by cornerback Torrey Stewart, the other by David Roach, setting up a field goal.  However, Texas came out roaring with 27 unanswered points to open the second half and ended up winning easily, 34–13.

Air Force

Air Force erased a 17–3 4th-quarter deficit and won, 20–17.  TCU kicker Chris Manfredini missed a 36-yard field goal in overtime before Air Force kicked the winning field goal.  TCU quarterback Andy Dalton had 320 yards passing, a career high, but was also intercepted twice.

SMU

The Mustangs were the first to strike paydirt in TCU's Homecoming game, with a 15-yard touchdown run by running back DeMyron Martin in the first quarter.  The TCU special teams and defense answered to give the Frogs the lead for good, though.  They evened the score on a blocked punt that wide receiver Bart Johnson returned for a touchdown, and then linebacker Robert Henson took an interception back 58 yards for a score early in the second quarter.  Derek Moore hauled in a Marcus Jackson pass to give the Frogs a 21–7 lead at halftime, and that ended up being the final score as well.  With the win, the Frogs now hold a 41–39–7 advantage in the series, which is called "The Battle for the Iron Skillet".

Colorado State

Marcus Jackson, filling in for an injured Andy Dalton, ran for two touchdowns and threw for another, and the TCU defense kept Colorado State's offense out of the endzone until the 4th quarter to emerge victorious on Family Weekend.

Wyoming 

With 6:30 remaining in the 4th quarter, TCU found themselves behind the Cowboys in Laramie, Wyoming.  Andy Dalton then threw a 26-yard touchdown to Ervin Dickerson to make the score 24–14.  On the ensuing Wyoming possession, the Frogs forced a three & out before sacking the Cowboy punter on his own 29-yard line, turning the ball over on downs.  Six plays later, Dalton found Bart Johnson for another score, pulling the Frogs to within 24–21.  TCU got the ball back with 1:17 to play on their own 20-yard line, driving themselves into position for a potential game-tying 48-yard field goal, but kicker Chris Manfredini's attempt hit the right goalpost as time expired.

Stanford

A week after defeating top-ranked USC, Stanford welcomed TCU to Palo Alto for their Homecoming.  It was also the first-ever meeting between the two schools.  The Frogs again found themselves with a double-digit deficit late in the second half in this game, as they trailed the Cardinal 31–17 with 3:54 remaining in the 3rd quarter.  Andy Dalton then hit Jimmy Young for a 70-yard touchdown and Aaron Brown for a 2-yard touchdown pass on fourth down to tie the game at 31.  Stanford kicked a field goal with 7:22 remaining to re-take the lead, 34–31.  Aaron Brown gave TCU its first lead of the game with a 2-yard touchdown run with 4:13 left.  An intentional safety by TCU in the final seconds made the final score 38–36.  Andy Dalton ended the game with a career-high 344 passing yards.

Utah

This was the fifth meeting between the Frogs and the Utes, a series which Utah leads 4–1.  Two years ago, the Frogs snapped Utah's 18-game win streak with a 23–20 overtime win in Fort Worth. Last year, Utah defeated TCU 20–7 in Salt Lake City, which was one of only two defeats the Frogs suffered in 2006.

New Mexico

This will be the ninth meeting between the Frogs and the Lobos, a series that dates back to 1991 and that TCU leads, 5–3.  The Frogs have won both contests between the schools since joining the MWC, including a 27–21 win last year in New Mexico.

BYU

This was the seventh meeting between the Frogs and the Cougars, who are the two most recent MWC Champions. On their way to the 2005 league title, the Frogs pulled out a thrilling 51–50 win in triple overtime at LaVell Edwards Stadium in Provo. Last year, BYU defeated TCU 31–17 in Fort Worth on their way to the 2006 title.

UNLV

This will be the sixth meeting between the Frogs and the Rebels, with TCU leading the series 4–1.  The Frogs have won the last two meetings between the schools by a combined score of 76–13.

San Diego State

TCU and San Diego State had never played before TCU joined the MWC in 2005, and the Frogs have been victorious in both meetings between the schools, including a 52–0 win in Fort Worth last year.

The Texas Bowl

References

TCU
TCU Horned Frogs football seasons
Texas Bowl champion seasons
TCU Horned Frogs football